Rivière des Galets may refer to:
 		 		
 Rivière des Galets (Mauritius), a river in Mauritius
 Rivière des Galets (Réunion),  a river in Réunion